Prodyut Kumar Deka (born 18 April 1978) is an Indian film director, Screenwriter and Author residing in Assam, India. His films include Dhunia Tirutabur, Samiran Barua Ahi Ase, Surjasta, Borosi, Chiyahir Rong, Ji Golpor Ses Nai and The Government Servant. He turned to writing english fiction gradually from 2016-17 with the anthropological Ambari Series based on the Ambari Archeological site in Guwahati.

Career

In Films & Television

He made his debut as scriptwriter and director with the critically acclaimed Assamese film Dhunia Tirutabur (Beautiful Woman),on the backdrop of a lost artiste in 2010. 
 His next film based on a political subject Samiran Barua Ahi Ase (Return of Samiran Barua) was released in 2012.

His other films include Surjasta (A Sunset), on the subject of child negligence and a suspense drama Borosi (The Trap) and a television film based on Rabindranath Tagore's story Dristi (The Vision). The film Surjasta received two nomination in Best Actor Male and Female category in Filmfare Awards 2013 (East). 

An anthology film consisting of three stories titled Ji Golpor Sesh Nai directed by three different directors including Prodyut Kumar Deka was completed in 2019. A special screening of the film was held on 18 April 2019 and received favorable praise from the media.
   

His latest projects include Chiyahir Rong, a film about newspaper houses in Assam, based on a story by journalist Jitumoni Bora and released online in Reel Drama portal in 2021, and the forthcoming The Government Servant, a film based on a story in the backdrop of Mayong by Sahitya Akademi Award winner Jayant Madhab Bora.

He was Co-Scriptwriter of the films Orong (Strangers in the Mist) (2015) on child psychology and Rum Vodka Whiskey (2017), based on three unsuccessful love stories in different seasons. Orong won the National Award for Best Rabha film in 2015. He also made two short films based on essays written by eminent Assamese writer and journalist Homen Borgohain titled Why I write (2008) and A short film about Walking (2011) which were shown in various film festivals.
 He also made a 50-minute documentary named An Anti-insurgent Journey depicting how former Asam Sahitya Sabha Chief Kanaksen Deka was vocal against subversive activities of the outfit in the nineties, despite knowing that his tough stand might invite death.

Theatre

He revived the theatre group Aikyatan in late 2010s, originally founded by his father Pabitra Kumar Deka in the early 1970s and directed intimate plays like Moni Kanchan written by Badal Sircar, Jonakor Pohar (The Rising of the Moon), The Game of Chess, etc. Assamese translation of the play Eserenga Rod (A Sunny Morning) was done by Deka and directed by Pranjal Saikia which was performed in Natasurjya Drama Festival 2016, Guwahati; Kartik Hazarika National Drama Festival 2019, Tezpur and in Poorvottar Rashtriya Rang Utsav, 2017 in many cities like New Delhi, Amritsar, Jaipur and Vadodara. 

Also associated with Indian People's Theatre Association, Assam, he has directed Coffee Housot Apeksha (On the occasion of platinum jubilee)  and An Inspector Calls in 2019 at Guwahati.

As Author

He writes on Cinema in the local Assamese newspapers like Sadin, Asomiya Pratidin and Asomiya Khabar. Published books on Cinema are Amar Kotha Teolokor Kotha (2014) and Cinema Suwar Ananda (2017), both anthologies of essays on diverse facets of Indian and foreign films. Two notable works include, a biography of the famous actor Biju Phukan: A Life in Cinema (2021) which won the Best Book on Cinema award in the Prag Cine Awards, 2022 and Doordarshanor Dinbur (2023), a history of television or Doordarshan in Assam.

Ambari is a trilogy of anthropological novels written by Prodyut Kumar Deka based on the Ambari Archeological site which was discovered in Guwahati in 1969. He wrote the first novel Ambari in 2017.  The second part Prophecy of Ambari was published in 2018, while the concluding part A Monk in Ambari was published in 2020. All the three books have been published by Delhi-based Educreation Publishing.

Personal life
Prodyut Kumar Deka was born in Guwahati to film critic, screenwriter and humor writer Pabitra Kumar Deka. He passed his graduation in Commerce in 2000 and completed Law in 2006 from Gauhati University. He works as a Senior Administrative Assistant in the Assam Secretariat since 2010 and lives in Roopkar, Pub-Sarania, Guwahati (India). He along with his family members also runs a non-government organization Pabitra Kumar Deka Archive, an archive of old Assamese film materials, in memory of his father at their residence. The archive presents Roopkar Award to one outstanding personality every year from stage, film and media.

Filmography

As Producer/Director

As Story/Script Writer/Co Writer

Published books

Cinema

Novels

See also
 List of Assamese films of the 2000s 
 List of Assamese films of the 2010s 
 List of Assamese films of 2014
 Dhunia tirutabur
 Samiran Barua Ahi Ase
 Surjasta
 Borosi

References

Writers from Guwahati
Assamese-language film directors
Film directors from Assam
21st-century Indian film directors
English-language writers from India
Novelists from Assam
Screenwriters from Assam